George Paul Breakston (January 22, 1920 – May 21, 1973) was a French-American actor, producer and film director, active in Hollywood from his days as a child actor in Andy Hardy films in the 1930s (where he played the character Beezy), to a period as an independent producer/director in the 1950s.

Biography
Breakston was the son of French-born Jacqueline DuVal. He first entered the entertainment world by working in radio as a child actor from 1930.  Hs came to the notice of Hollywood and appeared in a variety of films. He made his stage debut in A Midsummer Night's Dream and made his motion picture debut in It Happened One Night (1934).

During World War II he was commissioned in the US Army Signal Corps through Officers Candidate School then served in the Pacific War as a photographer.  When the war ended Breakston remained in Japan. 

He reentered the civilian film world by co-writing, producing, directing and starring in Urubu: The Vulture People filmed in location in the Mato Grosso, Brazil. He followed it up with the documentary African Stampede filmed in the Belgian Congo and Kenya where he would later make his home.

Returning to Japan, Breakston co-produced and wrote Tokyo File 212 a 1951 American film credited as Hollywood's first feature film totally filmed in Japan. He followed it up by filming and directing Oriental Evil (1951) and  Geisha Girl (1952) in Japan. He had planned a film, which according to Los Angeles Times had interested Errol Flynn.

Breakston moved to Kenya filming several safari adventure feature films The Scarlet Spear, Golden Ivory, Escape in the Sun, and Woman and the Hunter.  Many of these featured John Bentley who starred in a television series produced by Breakston and filmed in Kenya, African Patrol.  Breakston also filmed another series in Kenya Adventures of a Jungle Boy (1957) and planned a third Trader Horn.

Breakston joined the horror bandwagon by making The Manster in 1959 back in Japan, then made several films in Yugoslavia.

He died in Paris on May 21, 1973.

Selected filmography

 It Happened One Night (1934, actor) - Boy Bus Passenger (uncredited)
 No Greater Glory (1934, actor) - Nemecsek
 A Successful Failure (1934, actor) - Tommy Cushing
 Mrs. Wiggs of the Cabbage Patch (1934, actor) - Jimmy Wiggs
 Great Expectations (1934, actor) - Pip, as Child
 Life Returns (1935, actor) - Danny Kendrick
 The Dark Angel (1935, actor) - Joe Gallop
 The Return of Peter Grimm (1935, actor) - William Van Dam
 Boulder Dam (1936, actor) - Stan Vangarick
 Small Town Girl (1936, actor) - Little Jimmy (uncredited)
 Second Wife (1936, actor) - Jerry Stephenson
 Love Finds Andy Hardy (1938, actor) - 'Beezy'
 Jesse James (1939, actor) - Farmer Boy
 Boy Slaves (1939, actor) - Harvey (uncredited)
 Andy Hardy Gets Spring Fever (1939, actor) - 'Beezy'
 Judge Hardy and Son (1939, actor) - 'Beezy' Anderson
 Swanee River (1939, actor) - Ambrose
 The Grapes of Wrath (1940, actor) - Boy (uncredited)
 Andy Hardy Meets Debutante (1940, actor) - 'Beezy'
 Andy Hardy's Private Secretary (1941, actor) - Beezy
 Life Begins for Andy Hardy (1941, actor) - Beezy, the Milkman (uncredited)
 I Killed That Man (1941, actor) - Tommy
 The Courtship of Andy Hardy (1942, actor) - 'Beezy'
 Men of San Quentin (1942, actor) - Louie Howard
 Urubu: The Vulture People (1948, actor, producer and director) - George
 Jungle Stampede (1950, actor, producer and director) - George Breakston (final film role)
 Tokyo File 212 (1951, producer)
 Oriental Evil (1951, producer and director)
  Geisha Girl (1952, producer and director)
 Golden Ivory (aka "The White Huntress"; 1954, producer and director)
 The Scarlet Spear (1954, director)
 Escape in the Sun (1956, producer and director)
 Woman and the Hunter (1957, producer and director)
 The Manster (1961, producer and director)
 Shadow of Treason (1964, producer and director)
 The Boy Cried Murder (1966, director)

References

Further reading 
 Holmstrom, John (1996). The Moving Picture Boy: An International Encyclopaedia from 1895 to 1995, Norwich, Michael Russell, p. 95-96.
 Dye, David (1988). Child and Youth Actors: Filmography of Their Entire Careers, 1914-1985. Jefferson, NC: McFarland & Co., 1988, p. 24-25.
 Willson, Dixie (1935). Little Hollywood Stars. Akron, OH, and New York: Saalfield Pub. Co, pp. 119–127.

External links

 

1920 births
1973 deaths
French film directors
American film directors
American male child actors
20th-century American male actors
American film producers
French emigrants to the United States
United States Army personnel of World War II
American expatriates in Japan
American expatriates in Kenya